Neocrepidodera impressa is a species of flea beetle from Chrysomelidae family that can be found everywhere in Europe except for Andorra, Austria, Baltic states, Czech Republic, Hungary, Liechtenstein, Moldova, Monaco, North Macedonia, Poland, Romania, San Marino, Vatican City, and eastern Europe.

References

Beetles described in 1801
Beetles of Europe
impressa